Glyptoconus is a genus of air-breathing land snails, terrestrial pulmonate gastropod mollusks in the family Streptaxidae.

Distribution 
The distribution of the genus Glyptoconus includes:
 Busuangga Island, the Philippines

Species
Species within the genus Glyptoconus include:
 Glyptoconus mirus Möllendorff - the type species of the genus Glyptoconus

See also 
The conodont genus name  Glyptoconus Kennedy, 1981 has been replaced by Colaptoconus in 1994.

References 

Streptaxidae
Gastropod genera